The Myrtle Beach Mutiny were an American soccer team based in Myrtle Beach, South Carolina, United States. The Myrtle Beach Mutiny was owned by Coast FA.

Kit provider
During the 2018 season, the Mutiny's kit was provided by Capelli Sport, which served as the uniform sponsors.

Seasons

Honors
 Premier Development League
South Atlantic Division
Champions (2): 2017, 2018
 National Premier Soccer League
South Atlantic Division
Champions (2): 2015, 2016

Staff

Latest staff
  Patrick Piscitelli – Sports Director
  Ross Morgan – Technical Director
  Kyle Timm – Head Coach
  Marcos Spanos - Assistant Coach
  Burt Marlow - Kit Manager
  Robert Downes - Marketing Director
  Manny Ardeljan - Game Day Operations
  Brian Smith - Sponsorship Director

Stadium
The Mutiny played at North Myrtle Beach Park and Sports Complex North Myrtle Beach. Training sessions at Socastee Recreation Park in Socastee.

Off the field
Despite their success on the field, the team folded in 2018.<ref>

References

External links

Soccer teams in South Carolina
National Premier Soccer League teams
2011 establishments in South Carolina
Association football clubs established in 2011
Association football clubs disestablished in 2018
Sports in Myrtle Beach, South Carolina